Joseph Onésime Zephirin Jean Jacques Toupin (November 10, 1910 – February 17, 1987) was a professional ice hockey player who played eight games in the National Hockey League. Born in Trois-Rivières, Quebec, he played with the Chicago Black Hawks.

External links

1910 births
1987 deaths
Canadian expatriate ice hockey players in the United States
Canadian ice hockey right wingers
Chicago Blackhawks players
Ice hockey people from Quebec
Sportspeople from Trois-Rivières